Nepoměřice is a municipality and village in Kutná Hora District in the Central Bohemian Region of the Czech Republic. It has about 200 inhabitants.

Administrative parts
Villages of Bedřichov and Miletice are administrative parts of Nepoměřice.

References

Villages in Kutná Hora District